K283CH (104.5 FM) is an American terrestrial FM radio translator licensed to and operating in Houston, Texas.

History

On August 14, 2015, K283CH signed on the air at 104.5 FM. It was leased by iHeartMedia to relay KTBZ-FM HD2, which carried a regional Mexican format branded as La Mejor.

On September 7, 2017, the station switched to a simulcast of KQBT HD2, which launched a new urban adult contemporary format as 104.5 Kiss FM. The new station aimed to compete against Urban One's dominant KMJQ.

On February 18, 2019, the lease with iHeart Media ended, leading the owner operator, Centro Cristiano de Vida Eterna, to air an independent mix of urban gospel and R&B under the branding 104-5 I Hope FM. The previous format continued to be broadcast on KQBT HD2 as 93.7 HD2 Kiss FM until June 2019.

References

External links

283CH
Radio stations established in 2015
2015 establishments in Texas